Moore County High School is a six-year public high school in Lynchburg, Tennessee, serving students in grades 7–12 from Moore County, Tennessee, as part of the Moore County School District.

As of the 2005–06 school year, the school had an enrollment of 449 students and 29.8 classroom teachers (on a FTE basis, for a student-teacher ratio of 15.1.

Notable alumni
Jimmy Bedford (1940-2009), sixth master distiller at Jack Daniel's.

References

Public high schools in Tennessee
Schools in Moore County, Tennessee
Public middle schools in Tennessee
Lynchburg, Tennessee